The 2018–19 Sultan Qaboos Cup is the 46th season of the Sultan Qaboos Cup, the national football cup competition of Oman. The winners of the competition will earn a spot in the 2020 AFC Cup.

First qualifying round
The matches were played on 6 September 2018.

Second qualifying round
The match was played on 10 September 2018.

Round of 32
The matches were played on 18–19 September 2018.

Round of 16
The matches were played on 7–8 October 2018.

Quarter-finals
The first legs were played on 6 November, and the second legs were played on 4–5 December 2018.

|}

Semi-finals
The first legs were played on 6 March, and the second legs were played on 17 March 2019.

|}

Final

References

External links
Soccerway

Sultan Qaboos Cup seasons
Oman
Sultan Qaboos Cup